Antonia Delaere (born 1 August 1994) is a Belgian basketball player for Casademont Zaragoza, in the Liga Femenina de Baloncesto, the Spanish Women's League. She also plays in the Belgian national team.

She participated at the EuroBasket Women 2017 and the EuroBasket Women 2021.

References

External links
 
 
 
 

1994 births
Living people
Basketball players at the 2020 Summer Olympics
Belgian expatriate basketball people in France
Belgian women's basketball players
Olympic basketball players of Belgium
Small forwards
Sportspeople from Antwerp